Corey Sweet (born 25 November 1976) is an Australian former racing cyclist, who competed as a professional from 1999 to 2007.

Major results
Source:

1997
 1st Overall Tour of Wellington
1999
 7th Overall Herald Sun Tour
2000
 4th Overall Ringerike GP
2001
 6th Overall Tour de Luxembourg
2002
 1st Hel van het Mergelland
 1st Stage 3 Tour de Luxembourg
2004
 3rd Overall Tour of Queensland
1st Stage 6
 3rd Sparkassen Giro Bochum
 4th Overall Niedersachsen-Rundfahrt
1st Mountains classification
 5th Omloop der Kempen
 6th Rund um den Flughafen Köln-Bonn
 6th GP Aarhus
 8th Rund um die Hainleite
 10th Rund um Düren
 10th Rund um Köln
2005
 6th Overall Bayern–Rundfahrt
 7th Rund um Düren
 10th Overall Niedersachsen-Rundfahrt
2007
 4th Overall Circuit des Ardennes
 4th Overall Rheinland-Pfalz Rundfahrt

References

External links

1976 births
Living people
Australian male cyclists
Cyclists from Adelaide